Élisabeth Ercy (born 20 July 1944) is a German-born French actress. Making her film debut in Phaedra (1962) by Jules Dassin, she began a brief film career that included English-language roles, such as in the horror film The Sorcerers (1967). During the 1960s, she was in a relationship with actor Michael Caine.

Filmography 

 Phaedra (1962)
 The Victors (1963)
 Mort, où est ta victoire? (1964)
 Les Amoureux du France (1964)
 Sans merveille (1964)
 Marvelous Angelique (1965)
 Pas de caviar pour tante Olga (1965)
 Doctor in Clover (1966)
 The Sorcerers (1967)
 Fathom (1967)

References

External links 
 

Living people
1944 births
French film actresses
20th-century French actresses
People from Dresden